Slam is a 2018 Australian drama film written and directed by Partho Sen-Gupta.

Plot 
Ricky Nasser is a young Australian whose peaceful suburban life turns into hell when sister Ameena, a slam poet, disappears without a trace.

Cast 
Adam Bakri as Ricky Nasser
Rachael Blake as Joanne Hendricks
Rebecca Breeds as Sally McLeary - Nasser
Darina Al Joundi as Rana Nasser
Danielle Horvat as Ameena Nasser
Abby Aziz as Hanan Faour
Damian Hill as Shane
Russell Dykstra as Koustakidis

Production
Slam  is an official Australian-French co-production with funding from Screen Australia, Screenwest, Screen NSW, the French National Center of Cinematography and the moving image and private funders. The main roles are played by Adam Bakri and Rachael Blake. It was an official selected project at the 2016 International Film Festival Rotterdam's CineMart and the 2016 Berlinale Co-production Market.

The film is set in modern-day Sydney, Australia, and was shot on location in its western suburbs.

Release
Slam had its world premiere at the Official Selection Competition at the Tallinn Black Nights Film Festival on 27 November 2018.

On 15 June 2019, the film had its Australian premiere at the Sydney Film Festival in the Special Presentations section at the State Theatre. It went on to screen at many film festivals, notably at the Melbourne International Film Festival, and was the opening film at the 2019 Darwin International Film Festival.

Reception 
British film critic Victor Fraga of DMovies called it "the film of the year" in his review of the premiere screening at the 2018 Tallinn Black Nights Film Festival.

After the Australian premiere at the 2019 Sydney Film Festival, academic researcher Ingrid Matthews reviewed the film for the Australian Critical Race & Whiteness Studies (ACRAWSA) blog, writing, "Slam is a devastating film. Devastatingly good, devastatingly sad, and devastatingly accurate in its portrayal of racism in Australia. The camera turns its gaze on two institutions in particular: the media; and law enforcement." Film Critic Christine Westwood wrote in Filmink "For all its tough subject matter, Slam is a gripping, entertaining mystery. You can’t turn away from it until the very end."

The film had a limited theatrical release in Australia on 17 October 2019 and received many positive reviews. The Australian award-winning film critic David Stratton gave the film 4/5 stars in his video review 'David Stratton Recommends' and, in The Australian, stated "Slam is very impressive: it tells an important story in a convincing and enthralling way".

The film critic Sandra Hall also gave it 4/5 stars in her review in The Sydney Morning Herald, and The Age writing "[Director Partho Sen-Gupta]'s a confident talent with a finely tuned instinct for the mechanics of plot and character. There's a lot going on in this film and although the conclusion it reaches is pretty predictable, the trajectory it takes is not."
 
Jim Schembri, Journalist, critic, and author gave the film 3 1/2 Stars on 3AW and said "Without descending into hysterics writer/director Partho Sen-Gupta does a fine job detailing how promptly fear and suspicion can be coaxed used to promote an official agenda. It's a strong-minded, subdued film that bravely confronts the politics of grief." 
Film Critic Richard Kuipers, in Variety, called it "an outstanding slow-burn thriller".

Guardian Australia film critic Luke Buckmaster named the film as one of "The best Australian films of 2019", and wrote "Sen-Gupta doesn’t turn a blind eye to grim reality, nor does he prioritise verisimilitude over dramatically interesting storytelling."

References

External links 
 
 

2018 films
Australian drama films
French drama films
2018 drama films
2010s English-language films
2010s French films